Topside is an unincorporated community in the town of Iron River, Bayfield County, Wisconsin, United States.

References

Unincorporated communities in Bayfield County, Wisconsin
Unincorporated communities in Wisconsin